Songwe Airport , usually referred to in flight schedules as Mbeya (using the "MBI" IATA code from the unpaved Mbeya Airport), is an airport located in the southern highland region of Mbeya Region, Tanzania, serving the city of Mbeya. it is the largest Airport in SouthWest Tanzania. Also, due to its proximy to the regional border, it serves the Songwe Region as well.

History
Redevelopment of Songwe Airport began in 2001. The Tanzania Civil Aviation Authority issued a NOTAM on 12 December 2012 saying "WEF 13 DEC 2012 new airport called Songwe opened and operational."

Airlines and destinations

Scheduled flights
In the past, regular services have been provided by Air Tanzania, Tropical Air, Auric Air, Fastjet Tanzania, and Precision Air; but, apart from Air Tanzania, these airlines have discontinued their scheduled services; charter flights can still be arranged with Tropical Air and Auric Air.

See also
 List of airports in Tanzania
 Transport in Tanzania

References

External links

OurAirports - Songwe Airport
OpenStreetMap - Songwe Airport

 
 

Airports in Tanzania
Buildings and structures in the Mbeya Region